Live and Swinging (subtitled The Gerald Wilson Orchestra Plays Standards and Blues) is a live album by the Gerald Wilson Orchestra recorded in 1967 and released on the Pacific Jazz label.

Reception

AllMusic rated the album with 4 stars.

Track listing 
All coompositions by Gerald Wilson except as indicated
 "Paper Man" (Charles Tolliver) - 6:46
 "I Should Care" (Axel Stordahl, Paul Weston, Sammy Cahn) - 3:27
 "I Got It Bad (and That Ain't Good)" (Duke Ellington, Paul Francis Webster) - 4:10
 "The "It's" Where It's At" - 5:38
 "Blues for a Scorpio" - 5:52
 "Li'l Darlin'" (Neal Hefti) - 5:17
 "Misty" (Erroll Garner, Johnny Burke) - 3:03
 "Viva Tirado" - 7:46
Recorded at Marty's on the Hill in Los Angeles, CA on March 31, 1967 (tracks 2, 3 & 7) and April 1, 1967 (tracks 1, 4-6 & 8)

Personnel 
Gerald Wilson - arranger, conductor
Gary Barone, Dick Forrest, Larry McGuire, Al Porcino, Alex Rodriguez, Charles Tolliver - trumpet
Mike Barone, Thurman Green, Lester Robinson - trombone
Don Switzer - bass trombone
Ramon Bojorquez, Anthony Ortega - alto saxophone
Hadley Caliman, Harold Land - tenor saxophone
Howard Johnson - baritone saxophone, tuba
Phil Moore III - piano
Jack Wilson - organ
Buddy Woodson - bass
Carl Lott - drums

References 

Gerald Wilson live albums
1967 live albums
Pacific Jazz Records live albums
Albums arranged by Gerald Wilson
Albums conducted by Gerald Wilson